Write On is the first of two 1976 studio albums from English rock/pop band, the Hollies, and their 16th UK studio album.  This album, like the previous one, features mostly songs written by the group's songwriting team.  The final track of the album is the only one not composed by them. This album was not issued in the US (although four of the album's ten tracks appeared on Epic Records' release, "Clarke, Hicks, Sylvester, Calvert, Elliott", issued in the North American market in 1977).

Overview and recording
The album is a combination of pop, guitar rock, country, reggae, and funk music. The Hollies' producer Ron Richards fell ill before the main work began, so recording engineer Peter Bown placed in production charge due to Richards's absence. Session musicians on the album included keyboard players Rod Argent (from the Zombies and Argent), Hans-Peter Arnesen (from The Rubettes), or Pete Wingfield. Recording sessions were held at the Abbey Road Studios and Emison Studios in Queensway. Drummer Bobby Elliott later stated that all the instrumental backing tracks got recorded in one piece by the band (plus piano) with a guide vocal by Clarke. The only overdubs being lead and backing vocals and instrumental solos.
LP was packaged in a simple, plain angular white sleeve with gold lettering (and gold image of band members on the back of the cover).

A few songs that were recorded and intended for the album were not used. Song "Born to Run" by Bruce Springsteen was also recorded, but the Hollies were not satisfied with their version and it was abandoned (singer Allan Clarke released his solo version in 1975). Another song "Samuel", written by Allan Clarke, was recorded and was not released until "The Hollies at Abbey Road (1973 to 1989)" CD compilation in 1998.

Reception
LP missed the official Record Retailer album chart in the United Kingdom, but entered Top 10 in the New Zealand (No. 9). National Rockstar called album "one of the most skillfully released pop albums since Honky Château…", and Girl About Town magazine wrote: "This album proves how creative and diversified one band and its music can be." (January 1976). On the other hand, according to Record Mirror: „The Hollies have lost their touch with this one.“ BBC radio disc jockey Noel Edmonds made LP his "album of the week" on his morning breakfast show. 
None of its 10 tracks were issued as singles in the UK, although opening track "Star" became Top 10 hit in the New Zealand (No. 7). Title track "Write On" reached No. 31 on the German charts and also Top 20 in the South Africa.  A live versions of "Star" and "My Island" appeared on the concert album "Hollies Live Hits" released in March 1977.

Record World called the title track "a hard hitting harmony laced ballad."

Track listing
All songs composed by Allan Clarke, Tony Hicks and Terry Sylvester except where noted.

Side 1
 "Star" – 3:39
 "Write On" – 4:50
 "Sweet Country Calling" – 3:06
 "Love Is The Thing" – 3:45
 "I Won't Move Over" – 3:31

Side 2
 "Narida" – 3:57
 "Stranger" – 3:29
 "Crocodile Woman (She Bites)" – 3:35
 "My Island" 4:22
 "There's Always Goodbye" (Randy Richards) – 4:15

French 1999 MAM Production HDCD digipack Edition's Bonus Tracks:

 "Boulder to Birmingham" (Emmylou Harris, Bill Danoff)
 "Samuel" (Allan Clarke, unedited version)
 "Star" (live)
 "My Island" (live)
 "Born To Run" (Bruce Springsteen) – Allan Clarke solo track

Personnel
The Hollies
Allan Clarke – lead vocals
Tony Hicks – lead guitar 
Terry Sylvester – rhythm guitar
Bernie Calvert – bass
Bobby Elliott – drums
with:
Pete Wingfield - piano, organ, ARP synthesizer
Hans-Peter Arnesen - piano, clavinet
Rod Argent - piano and synthesizer on "Star"
Tony Hymas - string arrangements

References

1976 albums
The Hollies albums
Polydor Records albums